John Chase may refer to:

 John Churchill Chase (1905–1986), American editorial cartoonist and historian
 John Chase (artist) (1810–1879), English painter
 John Chase (boxer), Irish Olympic boxer
 John Chase (ice hockey) (1906–1994), American ice hockey player and Olympic silver medalist
 John Chase (doctor and soldier) (1856–1918), American medical doctor and commander of the Colorado National Guard in Colorado Labor Wars and Ludlow Massacre
 John B. Chase (1872–1960), American politician
 John C. Chase (1870–1939), American trade union activist and politician
 John F. Chase (1843–1914), American Civil War soldier and Medal of Honor recipient
 John Paul Chase (1901–1973), criminal associate of Baby Face Nelson and Homer Van Meter
 John S. Chase (1925–2012), American architect 
 Johnny Chase: Secret Agent of Space, radio serial

See also
Jack Chase (disambiguation)
Jonathan Chase (disambiguation)